Charaxes pembanus is a butterfly in the family Nymphalidae. It is found on Pemba Island, just off the east coast of Africa.

Description
Similar to Charaxes usambarae  but with shorter tails, less dentate wing margins and the females with larger pale forewing spots.

Biology
The habitat consists of forest margins and woodland.

The larvae probably feed on Albizia species.

Taxonomy
Charaxes pembanus is a member of the large species group Charaxes etheocles.

References

Victor Gurney Logan Van Someren, 1966 Revisional notes on African Charaxes (Lepidoptera: Nymphalidae). Part III. Bulletin of the British Museum (Natural History) (Entomology) 45–101. page 70 Plate 9, figures 67–68, 71–72.

External links
Charaxes pembanus images at Consortium for the Barcode of Life
NSG Images

Butterflies described in 1925
pembanus
Endemic fauna of Tanzania
Butterflies of Africa